TWRP may stand for:

 TWRP (band), a Canadian rock band formed in 2007, formerly known as Tupper Ware Remix Party
 TWRP (software), an open-source software custom recovery image for Android-based devices